Andrea Baccarelli (born December 6, 1970) is an Italian American epigeneticist and clinical endocrinologist, best known for his academic contributions in the field of epigenetics, mitochondriomics, and computational epigenomics, with a research focus on investigating the impact of environmental exposures on human health. He serves as Professor and Chair of the Department of Environmental Health Sciences at the Columbia University Mailman School of Public Health.

Education and career
Baccarelli obtained his Master of Science in Epidemiology from the University of Turin, Italy, in 2000 and his Ph.D. in Molecular Epidemiology from the Universita' degli Studi di Milano, Italy, in 2003.

He completed his residency in endocrinology at the University of Milan and his postdoctoral fellowship at the National Cancer Institute’s Division of Cancer Epidemiology and Genetics (2000-2004).

Baccarelli has served as the Environmental Health Sciences Department Chair and the Director of the Laboratory of Precision Environmental Biosciences at the Columbia University Mailman School of Public Health since 2016. Prior to joining Columbia University in 2016, he was the Mark and Catherine Winkler Associate Professor of Environmental Epigenetics at the Harvard School of Public Health.

He was elected to the National Academy of Medicine and as President of the International Society of Environmental Epidemiology in 2020.

Awards and recognition 
Baccarelli was recognized as the “Person of the Year” by the City of Perugia, Italy.

Selected publications 

 Baccarelli A, Bollati V. Epigenetics and environmental chemicals. Curr Opin Pediatr. 2009 Apr;21(2):243-51.
Marioni, R.E., Shah, S., McRae, A.F. et al. DNA methylation age of blood predicts all-cause mortality in later life. Genome Biol 16, 25 (2015).
 Baccarelli, Andrea; Wright, Robert O.; Bollati, Valentina. et al. "Rapid DNA Methylation Changes after Exposure to Traffic Particles".
Bollati, Valentina, et al. "Changes in DNA methylation patterns in subjects exposed to low-dose benzene." Cancer research 67.3 (2007): 876-880.
Levine, Morgan E., et al. "An epigenetic biomarker of aging for lifespan and healthspan." Aging (Albany NY) 10.4 (2018): 573.

References

External links 

1970 births
Living people
Members of the National Academy of Medicine